Yuth Angkinandana (6 April 1936 – 17 February 2023) was a Thai politician. A member of the Thai Nation Party and later the Chart Pattana Party, he served in the House of Representatives from 1983 to 2001.

Angkinandana died in Phetchaburi province on 17 February 2023, at the age of 86.

References

1936 births
2023 deaths
Yuth Angkinan
Yuth Angkinan
Yuth Angkinan
Yuth Angkinan
Yuth Angkinan
Yuth Angkinan